The Watertown Pirates were a Short-Season Class-A minor league baseball team located in Watertown, New York.  The team played in the New York–Penn League from 1983 to 1998. They played their home games at the Duffy Fairgrounds Ball Park.

From 1983 until 1988 the club was affiliated with the Pittsburgh Pirates. Some notable Pirates, players from this era are Tim Wakefield, Jay Buhner, and Moisés Alou. In 1989 the team became in an affiliate of the Cleveland Indians and were renamed the Watertown Indians. The team relocated to Staten Island, New York for the 1999 season and became the Staten Island Yankees.

Notable alumni

 Moises Alou (1986-1987) 6 x MLB All-Star

 Jay Buhner (1983) MLB All-Star

 Sean Casey (1995) 3 x MLB All-Star

 Felix Fermin (1983)

 Brian Giles (1990) 2 x MLB All-Star

 Steve Kline (1993)

 Orlando Merced (1986-1987)

 Dave Mlicki (1990)

 Kelly Stinnett (1990)

 Tim Wakefield (1988) MLB All-Star; 200 MLB Wins

 John Wehner (1988)

External links
Photographs of Alex T. Duffy Fairgrounds, former home of the Watertown Indians – Rochester Area Ballparks
Listing of minor league baseball teams in Watertown, New York, with rosters and statistics
Last owner biographies
NY-Penn League Team History (1998–2005)
Move to Staten Island
More on the move to Staten Island
More on Sandlot Sports

Baseball teams established in 1983
Baseball teams disestablished in 1998
Cleveland Guardians minor league affiliates
Pittsburgh Pirates minor league affiliates
Defunct New York–Penn League teams
Defunct baseball teams in New York (state)
1983 establishments in New York (state)
1998 disestablishments in New York (state)
Sports teams in Watertown, New York